This is a list of songwriters, artists and bands published by Sony Music Publishing.

0–9
 7 Aurelius
 40 Below Summer
 50 Cent

A
 A1
 Acceptance
 Afrika Bambaataa
 Akon
 Alex Cartana
 Alison Clarkson
 Amen
 Andrea Martin
 Andy Bell
 Angie Stone
 Ant & Dec
 Anthony Rossomando
 Architecture in Helsinki
 Armand Van Helden
 AronChupa
 Atomic Kitten

B
 B2K
 Babyface
 Backstreet Boys
 Baha Men
 Ball Park Music
 Band of Skulls
 Band Ohne Namen
 Beck
 Beenie Man
 Belle & Sebastian
 Bernadette Nolan
 Beverley Knight
 Billy Bragg
 Billy Crawford
 Billy Mann
 Billy Ocean
 Björk
 The Black Eyed Peas
 Blazin' Squad
 Blondie
 Blue
 Bob Dylan
 Bob Luman
 BodyRockers
 Bomfunk MC's
 Bon Jovi
 Boy Kill Boy
 Boyz II Men
 Brenda Lee
 Brian Harvey
 Brian Kennedy
 Brian West
 Brick & Lace
 Bright Eyes
 Brooks & Dunn
 Bruce Springsteen
 Bryan Adams
 BTS
 Bush
 Busted

C
 Cardi B
 Carlos McKinney
 Cartel
 Cassidy
 Cat Stevens
 Catatonia
 Cathy Dennis
 Cedric Gervais
 Celine Dion
 Chantal Kreviazuk
 Charlie Pride
 Charlie Sexton
 Charlotte Sometimes
 Cher
 Cherry Ghost
 Cheyenne Kimball
 Chico Bennett
 Chink Santana
 Chris Braide
 Chris Cornell
 Chucky Thompson
 Claudette Ortiz
 Clean Bandit
 Clinic
 Colby O'Donis
 Collective Soul
 Conor Oberst and the Mystic Valley Band
 Conway Twitty
 Corinne Bailey Rae
 Crossfade
 Cubeatz
 Cyndi Lauper

D

 Daniel Bedingfield
 Daniel Powter
 Dannii Minogue
 Danny!
 Darrell Scott
 Darren Hayes
 Dave Grusin
 Dave Tozer
 David Crosby
 Def Leppard
 Delerium
 Delta Goodrem
 Des'ree
 Destiny's Child
 Die Antwoord
 Distant Soundz
 Dixie Chicks
 DJ Mustard
 DJ Snake
 Dolly Parton
 Don Gibson
 Donny Osmond
 Donovan
 Doves
 Duke Ellington

E
 Ed Sheeran
 Eg White
 Electric Six
 Ella Mai
 Elliott Yamin
 Elvis Presley
 Embrace
 Emma Bunton
 Eminem
 Engelbert Humperdinck
 Enya
 Erasure
 Estelle

F
 Fabolous
 Faith Hill
 Fall Out Boy
 Fetty Wap
 Five
 Five Finger Death Punch
 Flight of the Conchords
 Flo Rida
 Flobots
 Fran Healy
 Freestylers

G
 Gabrielle
 Gareth Gates
 Gary Barlow
 Gary Powell
 Gemma Fox
 George Michael
 George Strait
 Geri Halliwell
 Girls Aloud
 Glassjaw
 Goldie Lookin Chain
 Gorillaz
 Graham Nash
 Greg Laswell
 Gretchen Wilson
 GS Boyz
 Gwen Stefani

H
 H & Claire
 Hank Williams
 Hear’Say
 Hilary Duff
 Hockey
 Hope of the States
 Hundred Reasons

I
 Ian Brown
 Il Divo
 India.Arie
 Irv Gotti

J

 Jack Antonoff
 Jam & Spoon
 James Brown
 James Morrison
 Jason Nevins
 Jason Wade
 Jay Sean
 Jeff Buckley
 Jeff Carson
 Jennifer Lopez
 Jerry Wallace
 Jesse Harris
 Jessica Simpson
 Jessie Baylin
 Jet
 Jimi Hendrix
 Joe Diffie
 Joe Jackson
 Joe Strummer
 Joe Tex
 Joe Walsh
 Joey Purp
 John Legend
 John Mayer
 Johntá Austin
 Jonas Brothers
 Joni Mitchell
 Joss Stone
 Junior Jack

K
 Kaci
 Kameron Marlowe
 Kasabian
 Katie Melua
 Kate Bush
 Kelly Rowland
 King Princess
 Kish Mauve
 K'naan
 Kraftwerk
 KT Tunstall
 Kylie Minogue
 KSI

L

 Lady Gaga
 Lamb of God
 Las Ketchup
 Lauryn Hill
 LeAnn Rimes
 Lee Greenwood
 Lemar
 Lemon Jelly
 Lenka
 Leonard Cohen
 Liberty X
 Lil' Kim
 Linda Perry
 Linkin Park
 Little Richard
 Liz Phair
 LL Cool J
 Louis Biancaniello

M

 Maluma
 Måneskin
 Manic Street Preachers
 Marc Anthony
 Marc Nelson
 Mark Ronson
 Mario
 Mark Owen
 Mary J. Blige
 Maxwell
 MC Lyte
 Melanie Brown
 Mercury Rev
 Merle Haggard
 Michael Jackson (2012–present)
 Mike Mangini
 Miles Davis
 Mims
 Miniature Tigers
 Mint Royale
 Mis-Teeq
 Modest Mouse
 Modjo
 Mungo Jerry

N

 Narcotic Thrust
 Natasha Bedingfield
 Ne-Yo
 Neal McCoy
 Neil Diamond
 Nelly Furtado
 Nikki Flores
 Nikki Jean
 Nile Rodgers
 Nodesha
 Norah Jones

O
 Oasis
 Olivia
 Olivia Rodrigo
 OneRepublic
 Orbital
 Ozomatli

P
 Patsy Cline
 Paul Simon
 Pet Shop Boys
 Peter Cincotti
 Petula Clark
 Pharrell Williams
 Phats & Small
 Pink
 Plummet
 Psy

Q
 Queen
 Queens of the Stone Age

R

 R. Kelly
 Razorlight
 Reba McEntire
 Red
 Reef
 Richie Sambora
 Rick Ross
 Ricky Martin
 Rihanna
 Rise Against
 Rishi Rich
 Robert Palmer
 Robert Plant
 Roger Miller
 Rolling Stones
 Ronan Keating
 Roy Acuff
 Roy Orbison
 Ryan Adams

S

 S Club 7
 S Club Juniors
 Sade
 Safri Duo
 Saigon
 Sam & Mark
 Sam Smith
 Samantha Mumba
 Santana
 Sara Bareilles
 Sarah McLachlan
 Sarah Whatmore
 Sasha Dobson
 Scars on Broadway
 Scooch
 Scooter
 Sean Kingston
 Secondhand Serenade
 Shakira
 Shapeshifters
 She Wants Revenge
 Sia
 Simon Webbe
 Simple Kid
 Slade
 Snoop Dogg
 Souad Massi
 Sound the Alarm
 Speedway
 Spiller
 State of Shock
 Stephen Gately
 Stephen Stills
 Stevie Nicks
 Sue Thompson
 Suede
 Sugababes
 Sweetie Irie
 System Of A Down
 Systematic

T

Talay Riley
Taylor Swift
Tata Young
Teddy Geiger
The Almost
The Beautiful South
The Beatles
The Chainsmokers
The Champs
The Cheeky Girls
The D.E.Y.
The Everly Brothers
The Game
The Hoosiers
The Kid Laroi
The Kinks
The Knickerbockers
The Medic Droid
The Mescaleros
The Moody Blues
The Newbeats
The Philosopher Kings
The Rasmus
The Searchers
The Starting Line
The Ting Tings
The Vines
The Wreckers
Tim McGraw
Tiwa Savage
Tom Jones
Tomcraft
Tony Christie
Tori Kelly
Travis
Tweenies
Tymes 4

U
 UB40
 Unkle

V
 V
 Valencia
 Vato Gonzalez
 Vinylz
 VS

W

 We Are Scientists
 Westlife
 Wheatus
 Whitney Houston
 Will Smith
 Will Young
 Willie Nelson
 Wyclef Jean

Z
 Zak Abel

See also
 List of Sony Music artists

References

Bibliography

External links
 Sony/ATV Music Publishing official site
 Sony/ATV Music Publishing songwriters